West Manchester may refer to:

 West Manchester, Ohio
 West Manchester Township, York County, Pennsylvania